Sennan Fielding (born 14 November 1995 in Chesterfield) is a British racing driver.

Career

Karting
Born in Chesterfield, Fielding started karting in 2006, competing in multiple tournaments across Britain.

Lower Formulae
Fielding graduated to car racing in 2011, competing in the Ginetta Junior Championship for two seasons where he finished seventh in his debut season and vice-champion in his second.

In 2013, Fielding moved to the BRDC Formula 4 Championship with Douglas Motorsport, competing in three rounds of the 2013 season. The following season, he competed full-time with HHC Motorsport, where he took four wins to finish fourth.

Also in 2014, Fielding joined Euronova in a round of the Formula Renault 2.0 NEC championship (though he failed to start) and the final two rounds of the Italian F4 Championship where he finished fourth in the F4 Trophy standings.

In 2015, Fielding joined the MSA Formula Championship with JHR Developments. There he took three wins and finished fourth in the championship. He remained with the team for the following season and claimed a further five victories and finished vice-champion to Max Fewtrell.

British GT Championship

Fielding made his British GT debut driving for Steller Performance in an ageing Toyota GT86 GT4 with Tom Canning and Richard Williams, finishing in the points on three occasions and ending the season in 18th with 26 points.

In 2019, Fielding drove for Steller Performance for a second year in the British GT Championship with Richard Williams in an Audi R8 LMS GT4. They only scored points on two occasions, both in which they won the race, also starting from pole position at Donington, finishing 7th in the championship standings with 62.5 points.

Fielding and Williams made their GT3 debut for Steller driving the Audi R8 LMS Evo at Brands Hatch and finished sixth overall.

Racing record

Career summary

Complete British GT Championship results
(key) (Races in bold indicate pole position in class) (Races in italics indicate fastest lap in class)

† Driver did not finish, but was classified as he completed 90% race distance.

References

External links
 
 

1995 births
Living people
Sportspeople from Chesterfield, Derbyshire
English racing drivers
British F4 Championship drivers
Italian F4 Championship drivers
Formula Renault 2.0 NEC drivers
U.S. F2000 National Championship drivers
British GT Championship drivers
Ginetta Junior Championship drivers
JHR Developments drivers
Euronova Racing drivers
Fortec Motorsport drivers
Le Mans Cup drivers